Planet Dinosaur, is a six-part documentary television series created by Nigel Paterson and Phil Dobree, produced by the BBC, and narrated by John Hurt. It first aired in the United Kingdom in 2011, with VFX studio Jellyfish Pictures as its producer. It was the first major dinosaur-related series for BBC One since Walking with Dinosaurs. There are more than 50 different prehistoric species featured, and they and their environments were created entirely as computer-generated images, for around a third of the production cost that was needed a decade earlier for Walking with Dinosaurs. Much of the series' plot is based on scientific discoveries made since Walking with Dinosaurs, with episodes frequently stopping the action to show fossil evidence and the assumptions based on them. The companion book to Planet Dinosaur was released on 8 September 2011, and the DVD and Blu-ray were released on 24 October 2011. Planet Dinosaur is highly praised for its stunning graphics and 3D animation.

List of episodes 
{{Episode table |background=#A49478 |overall= |title= |aux1= |director= |writer= |airdate= |viewers= |country=UK |aux1T=Era |viewersR=  |episodes=
{{Episode list
 | EpisodeNumber= 1
 | Title=Lost World
 | RTitle=
 | Aux1= 95 mya
 | DirectedBy= Nigel Paterson
 | WrittenBy = Nigel Paterson & Tom Brass
 |OriginalAirDate = 
 |Aux4            = 4.74
 | ShortSummary= :95 million years ago, Late Cretaceous (Egypt, North Africa)

In a swamp in North Africa a herd of Ouranosaurus are spooked by a Spinosaurus, which ignores them. Instead, it hunts Onchopristis (a giant sawfish), which are migrating into freshwater rivers to breed. A Rugops watching nearby scavenges its leftovers. The episode cuts to a pair of young male Carcharodontosaurus, which are fighting to gain rights to hunt a herd of Ouranosaurus. The victor then hunts and kills one of the herbivores. The episode then cuts to the habitat of Spinosaurus during the dry season, where a drought is taking place. Spinosaurus competes for the remaining water and fish with a Sarcosuchus, which unlike dinosaurs can hibernate during droughts. When Sarcosuchus refuses to be intimidated, Spinosaurus is forced to hunt on land. After killing and eating a pterosaur, it comes across a group of Ouranosaurus. Catching the scent of a kill, it discovers a Carcharodontosaurus, which has brought down one of the Ouranosaurus. After a fight over the carcass, the Spinosaurus drives off the Carcharodontosaurus, although it is left with bite marks in its sail. It then journeys into the desert, taking a rest as the injuries weaken it. The narrator then explains that a million years later, rising sea levels destroyed the Spinosauruss habitat, ultimately dooming the species; the last scene shows the Spinosaurus lying lifeless in the desert having succumbed to its injuries, representing its extinction.Species:Referenced species:'''

|LineColor       = A49478
}}

{{Episode list
 | EpisodeNumber= 5
 | Title= New Giants
 | Aux1= 95 mya
 | DirectedBy= Nigel Paterson
 | WrittenBy = Nigel Paterson
 |OriginalAirDate = 
 |Aux4            = 53
 | ShortSummary=:95 million years ago, Late Cretaceous (Argentina, South America) 95 million years ago, Late Cretaceous (Egypt, North Africa)

In late Cretaceous South America at a nest site an Argentinosaurus hatches. A Lacusovagus almost immediately attacks it. A Skorpiovenator scares it away and then proceeds to kill and eat the Argentinosaurus hatchling. However, the Skorpiovenator flees when a herd of adult Argentinosaurus arrive, although they offer no protection for the hatchlings, which begin to feed on the surrounding vegetation. The episode then cuts to late Cretaceous North Africa, where a herd of Paralititan take a drink from a river to cool down. They are spooked when a group of crocodiles emerges from the water, and a juvenile becomes stuck in mud. A Sarcosuchus scares away the crocodiles and closes in on the trapped Paralititan. The episode returns to South America, where the herd of Argentinosaurus move across a volcanic ash field to find food. Because of their sheer size, they churn up the ground with each step, creating quicksand that becomes a death trap for the small Gasparinisaura, travelling with them. The titanosaurs find a clump of trees and begin feeding, but then are attacked by a group of Mapusaurus. The theropods manage to rip a chunk of meat off one of the sauropods, but the latter are not fatally wounded because of their size. During the attack, an agitated Argentinosaurus reers up and crushes one of the less cautious Mapusaurus. Back in North Africa, the Sarcosuchus gets a hold of one of the Paralititans legs, but a Carcharodontosaurus grips its neck and eventually wrestles it from the giant crocodilian's jaws. However, the adult Paralititan scares it away, and the juvenile survives. The episode finally cuts back to South America, where an injured Argentinosaurus lies dying from a Mapusaurus attack. A time lapse is then shown of Mapusaurus, Skorpiovenator, and Lacusovagus feeding on the carcass until the bones are all that's left. The narrator then explains that when Argentinosaurus became extinct, so did Mapusaurus. The same event happened with Paralititan and Carcharodontosaurus in Africa. The episode concludes with the Argentinosaurus body being shown decaying until only its bones are left to be fossilised, as the narrator explains that "when the sauropods died out, their predators lost their main food supply, and they too were doomed."Species:Referenced species:'|LineColor       = A49478
}}

}}

 Spin-offs 
CBBC aired a spin-off, Planet Dinosaur Files, from 29 September 2011, hosted by Jem Stansfield. Each episode compares three Mesozoic creatures and involves practical tests to replicate certain behaviours in an attempt to find out which creature holds a certain title, such as the "most powerful" theropod. A 60-minute 3-D spin-off of Planet Dinosaur was announced in July 2011, and was broadcast on 19 August 2012 under the name Ultimate Killers.
A companion book "Planet Dinosaur: The Next Generation of Killer Giants" was written by Cavan Scott and published sometime in 2012.

Reception
Tom Sutcliffe of The Independent found Planet Dinosaur to be visually "very polished and jazzed up" but that the "knowledge and science generally take second place to B-movie spectacle".
Riley Black, in a post on the Smithsonian Magazine website, commented, "What sets Planet Dinosaur apart, and what I enjoyed most, is the fact that a modicum of science is woven into each episode to back up the different vignettes being presented." She also added "...[while] Planet Dinosaur is not that perfect dinosaur documentary that we have all been hoping for, it is still far better than just about anything that I have seen lately."

Gordon Sullivan, from DVD Verdict concluded in a positive way, "Planet Dinosaur is a fine series that gives viewers a good sense of where our knowledge about dinosaurs is at the moment. Combining nature-documentary stylings with a competent narration from smooth-voiced John Hurt, Planet Dinosaur'' is sure to please budding paleontologists and older dinosaur fans alike."

References

External links

Planet Dinosaur Files

2011 British television series debuts
2011 British television series endings
BBC television documentaries
Documentary television series about dinosaurs
English-language television shows